The Liguilla of the 2010 Primera División de México Clausura was a final knockout tournament involving eight teams of the Primera División de México.

Teams
The 18 teams that participated in the 2010 Clausura were divided into three groups of six teams. The top two in each group qualify automatically. The two best teams in the General Table not already qualified, regardless of group, qualify as well.

Bracket
The eight qualified teams play two games against each other on a home-and-away basis. The winner of each match up is determined by aggregate score.

The teams were seeded one to eight in quarterfinals, and will be re-seeded one to four in semifinals, depending on their position in the general table. The higher seeded teams play on their home field during the second leg.

 If the two teams are tied after both legs, the higher seeded team advances.
 Both finalist qualify to the 2011–12 CONCACAF Champions League. The champion qualifies directly to the Group Stage, while the runner-up qualifies to the Preliminary Round.

Quarter-finals
The first legs of the quarterfinals were played on May 4 and 5. The second legs were played on May 7 and 8.

Kickoffs are given in local time (UTC-5).

First leg

Second leg

Guadalajara won 2–4 on aggregate

Cruz Azul won 1–2 on aggregate

UNAM 3–3 Monterrey. UNAM advances as higher seed

Morelia won 5–3 on aggregate

Semi-finals
The first legs of the Semifinal were played on May 12. The second legs were played on May 15.

Kickoffs are given in local time (UTC-5).

First leg

Second leg

UNAM won 3–1 on aggregate

Morelia won 3–2 on aggregate

Final

Kickoffs are given in local time (UTC-5).

First leg

Second leg

UNAM won 3–2 on aggregate